Estádio Municipal Professor Dario Rodrigues Leite, also known as Ninho da Garça, is a stadium in Guaratinguetá, Brazil. It has a capacity of 15,869 spectators.  It is the home of Guaratinguetá Futebol of the Campeonato Brasileiro Série C.

References

Football venues in São Paulo (state)
Sports venues in São Paulo (state)